Papiliocellulus is a genus of diatoms.

References 

 Papiliocellulus at WoRMS

Cymatosirales
Coscinodiscophyceae genera